Arpita is a given name. Notable people with the name include:

Arpita Singh (born 1937), Indian artist
Arpita Ghosh (born 1966), Indian theatre artist and politician
Arpita Pal, Indian film actress
Arpita Chakraborty, Indian singer

See also
Arpita (Hindu name)